Stahlmann is the debut studio album by German Neue Deutsche Härte band Stahlmann, released in 2010.

Track list

References 

2010 debut albums
Stahlmann albums